The Peruvian (German: Die Peruanerin) is a 1919 German silent drama film directed by Alfred Halm and starring Mady Christians, Reinhold Schünzel, and Paul Graetz.

Cast
 Mady Christians as Fernades Matamorer 
 Reinhold Schünzel as Egon Hartenstein 
 Paul Graetz as Sonnenschein - spekulant 
 Josefa Gettke as Rita 
 Hans Kuhnert as Maximilian von Hochberg 
 Maria Lux as Juana - dienerin 
 Ernst Pröckl as Elimar 
 Lina Salten as Sophia Hartenstein

References

Bibliography
 Bock, Hans-Michael & Bergfelder, Tim. The Concise CineGraph. Encyclopedia of German Cinema. Berghahn Books, 2009.

External links

1919 films
Films of the Weimar Republic
German silent feature films
Films directed by Alfred Halm
German black-and-white films
German drama films
1919 drama films
Silent drama films
1910s German films